Naturalist may refer to:
 Practitioner of naturalistic observation or natural history
 Conservation movement member
 Advocate of naturalism (philosophy) 
 Naturalist (book), autobiography

See also
 The American Naturalist, periodical
 Naturalism (disambiguation)
 Naturism, cultural and political movement advocating and defending social nudity in private and in public